Jamie Semple (born 17 May 2001) is a Scottish professional footballer who plays for Open Goal Broomhill as a Forward. He has previously played for Motherwell, Cove Rangers, East Fife and now currently Open Goal Broomhill.

Club career
Semple joined the Motherwell youth Academy in 2014, while being part of the Scottish FA performance School as a pupil at Braidhurst High School.

He made his first team debut for Motherwell on 27 April 2019, setting up the winning goal in injury time for David Turnbull in a 4–3 win at home to Dundee.

On 15 September 2020, Semple joined Scottish League One club Cove Rangers on a season-long loan. His loan was ended on 1 February 2021, when he was recalled by Motherwell.

Semple was released by Motherwell at the end of the 2020–21 season and he signed for East Fife in August 2021.

International career
Semple has played at under-17, under-18 and under-19 level for Scotland.

Career statistics

References

2001 births
Living people
People educated at Braidhurst High School
Scottish footballers
Footballers from Bellshill
Association football midfielders
Scotland youth international footballers
Motherwell F.C. players
Cove Rangers F.C. players
Scottish Professional Football League players
East Fife F.C. players
Broomhill F.C. (Scotland) players
Lowland Football League players